The 1930 Bago (Pegu) earthquake (Burmese: ၁၉၃၀ ပဲခူးတိုင်းငလျင်), also known as the Swa earthquake struck Myanmar on 5 May. The earthquake was the result of rupture along a  segment of the Sagaing Fault–a major strike-slip fault that runs through the country. Extensive damage was reported in the southern part of the country, particularly in Bago and Yangon, where buildings collapsed and fires erupted. At least 550, and possibly up to 7,000 people were killed. A moderate tsunami was generated along the Burmese coast which caused minor damage to ships and a port. The mainshock was followed by many aftershocks; several were damaging; additional earthquakes occurred in July and December, killing dozens. The December earthquake was a similarly-sized which also occurred along the Sagaing Fault.

Earthquake

Buildings and pagodas near the fault collapsed in a southeast (in Bago), east and east-southeast (Tawa), and west-northwest (Tongyi) direction. These collapse patterns indicate shaking occurred in an east–west to northwest–southeast direction. At locations far from the fault (Insein, Yangon, Syriam, and Kyauktan), shaking was in a north–south direction. These shaking reports supported a right-lateral rupture.

Widespread ground deformation was reported. Surface ruptures, fault scarps and fissures appeared. The 1930 Bago earthquake produced at least  of right-lateral offset.

The International Seismological Centre catalogued the earthquake at 7.4  at  depth.

Tectonic setting
Myanmar is wedged between four tectonic plates—the Indian, Eurasian, Sunda and Burma plates that interact due to active geological processes. Along the west coast of the Coco Islands, off the Rakhine coast, and into Bangladesh, is a highly oblique convergent boundary known as the Sunda megathrust. This large fault marks the boundary between the Indian and Burma plates. The megathrust emerges from the seafloor in Bangladesh, where it runs parallel and east of the Chin Hills. This boundary continues to north of Myanmar where it ends at the eastern Himalayas.

The Sagaing Fault is a transform fault that runs through Myanmar and connects the Andaman spreading center to a collision zone in the north. It accommodates motion between the Burma and Sunda Plates as they slide past each other at a rate of /yr. The Sagaing Fault is Myanmar's largest and most active source of seismic threat, running through or close to major cities including Yangon, Nay Pyi Daw and Mandalay. Large and damaging earthquakes occurred along the fault in 1931 ( 7.5), 1946 ( 7.3 & 7.7), 1956 ( 7.0), 1991 ( 6.9) and 2012 ( 6.9). The magnitude of earthquakes on the Sagaing Fault vary across the fault zone, from  7.0 to 8.0. The recurrence interval also vary depending on the location along the fault. The southern segments which ruptured in 1930 have short periods of 100–150 years based on paleoseismological studies.

Destructive earthquakes have affected the area for centuries but there is limited academic research to understand their seismological characteristics. Most earthquakes in Myanmar, including large, surface rupturing events are not well understood. A large  8.5–8.8 earthquake in 1762 ruptured a section of the Sunda megathrust off the Rakhine coast. That earthquake is thought have been the result of the Indian Plate subducting beneath the Burma Plate along the megathrust. Subduction of the Indian Plate also causes intraslab earthquakes beneath central Myanmar.

Intensity

The duration of shaking varied at locations, in Bago, it lasted no more than 30 seconds while in Yangon and Dala, it lasted for 1–1.5 minutes. Survivors recounted two episodes of shaking, separated by a short pause, while the latter was more intense. The first episode lasted 3–4 seconds. The second episode produced shaking in a north-northwest–south-southeast direction. In the meizoseismal area, shaking intensity peaked at IX on the Rossi–Forel scale within a pear-shaped area of  along the fault. Within this area, buildings were either partially or totally destroyed. Bago was located at the northern end of this isoseismal area. An eyewitness observed surface waves propagating through a tennis court in Bago. People on the ground were thrown upwards due to the shaking. Shaking was violent enough to create large fissures, and thrusted alluvium was observed during land surveys.

Intensity VIII was experienced in the townships of Kyauktan, Thongwa, Kayan, and Kawa. Many houses suffered significant damage while a few collapsed partially. Many household items reportedly fell towards the north or south, and large almirahs in a hospital and police station were thrown to the floor. Massive cracks appeared in the ground and sections of land fell into a nearby river. The regions of Toungoo and Yangon were within the intensity VI–VII zone. Poorly constructed buildings collapsed in this area. Brick chimneys and walls were thrown down due to the force of the earthquake. A number of buildings were so badly compromised that they were not safe for anyone to enter.

Subsequent events

Many aftershocks were felt in Bago, Onhne and Kawa after the earthquake. A strong aftershock on 16 September resulted in the cracking of a brick wall on a police station in Pado. It was also felt in Bago, Myitkyo and Yitkangale.

The Sagaing Fault produced a series of large earthquakes that would rupture more than half its length during the early 20th century. The first earthquake struck on 8 August 1929 and was locally destructive in Swa in the Toungoo. On 18 July 1930, an earthquake killed at least 50 people in the Ayeyarwady Region. In December 1930, another destructive earthquake of magnitude 7.3 struck further north along the Sagaing Fault, killing 30 people. The earthquake caused major damage in Pyu—many masonry buildings were levelled and railroads were twisted. Shoddily constructed buildings were destroyed. The December earthquake was triggered by coulomb stress transfer from the previous event in May. Subsequent large earthquakes followed in 1931, 1946 and 1956.

Impact

As many as 7,000 people may have perished in the earthquake. The earthquake left Bago in ruins. Fires erupted, causing further destruction in the city. There were also reports of severe liquefaction in the form of fissures erupting sand and water. Loud rumbling was heard in the city. The death toll was estimated at 500 or higher in Bago. The Shwemawdaw Pagoda, a religious monument in the city, was seriously weakened, and half the structure collapsed to the southeast. People who operated stalls at its base were killed.

The earthquake left Bago's market area in heaps of ruined bricks, twisted metal and charred wood. In the town center, buildings toppled in a southeasterly direction. The minarets of mosques collapsed onto alleys. The city's municipal building was heavily damaged while a ferrocement building at the eastern end of a bridge crossing the Bago River and a high school were razed.

In Yangon, the jewelled hti of the Shwedagon Pagoda, an important religious landmark in the city, was dislodged and left hanging. The earthquake threw people off the ground. More than 50 buildings had to be rebuilt. Conflagrations out and water pipelines ruptured. The confirmed death toll was reported at 50 or 58, but may be as high as 200. Most casualties in Yangon occurred when a mosque and five-storey building collapsed and buried everyone inside. A further 204 were injured by collapsing masonry.

The greatest damage occurred in the southern part of Yangon which sits on a river delta where alluvium is deposited by the Irrawaddy River. The British Geological Survey building along Dalhousie Road was suffered extensive cracks. The interior of the building which housed a laboratory and museum was in shambles. Along China Street, pucca houses caved inwards and numerous buildings were uninhabitable. The High Court Building and Roman Catholic Church suffered heavy damaged. City residents left their homes in a panic and sought refuge in vacant spaces and parks. The city was plunged in the dark due to damaged electrical systems while the fire department searched for victims.

In Tawa, seven people were killed; two buildings totally collapsed; pagodas and roads were destroyed; and subsidence occurred. Many ground cracks appeared—there was a large concentration of them west of the village. At Khayan, various buildings including a mosque and hospital partially collapsed. Fissures and vents ejected enough water and to bury parts of the town and cause floods. Between 12 and 16 deaths were reported in Kayan. Thongwa, which sits atop the Sagaing Fault suffered major destruction. A railway station platform fissured, while abutments of the railway bridge sank and were shifted from their original positions. Like in many other affected towns, most masonry buildings collapsed or were badly damaged.

There were reports that people could not stand due to the extreme ground motion. Surface waves were observed propagating through the ground. At a village in Thanatpin Township, its elevation was raised and construction was offset. Railroads were shifted and some tilted.

Tsunami
The tsunami travelled up the Sittaung River and flooded several villages along the way. The waves also caused ships to slam into the wharf resulting in damage to the port. The crew of the S.S. Queda and S.S. Ekma described the vessels rocking violently and shearing off their mooring bolts. No fatalities were reported and tidal gauges in Bangladesh and the coast of India did not record the tsunami.

Future threat

Seismologists have identified a ~-long seismic gap on the Sagaing Fault which did not rupture during the May and December 1930 earthquakes. This gap is located between the rupture zones of both events and is capable of producing an earthquake up to a magnitude of 7.0. North of Naypyidaw, a ~-long segment of the Sagaing Fault was also identified as a seismic gap. Known as the Meiktila segment, it is capable of producing a magnitude 7.9 earthquake. It stretches from Nay Pyi Taw to Mandalay. The last known earthquake in that area was the 1912 Maymyo earthquake with a magnitude of 7.7 however, that involved a rupture along the nearby Kyaukkyan Fault. It is believed that the segment last ruptured in the 1839 Ava earthquake. A recurrence interval of 330 to 460 years was estimated along the Meiktila segment for earthquakes of magnitude 7.8–7.9. It is expected that a magnitude 7.7 or greater earthquake could occur there.

In the 1930s, the population of Yangon was about 200,000 to 400,000 residents–which was considered small. However, the population has grown to about 6 million. A 2008 report by the World Agency for Planetary Monitoring and Earthquake Risk stated that there were nine possible earthquake scenarios in Yangon. The Sagaing Fault and other smaller but adjacent faults pose an earthquake threat to the city. The organization said there could be over 100,000 casualties from an earthquake in Yangon. Buildings during the British colonial period were carefully constructed and are earthquake resistant, but newer constructions do not follow seismic codes. The absence of construction-related policies and poor practices have made buildings vulnerable to earthquakes. Although some hazard maps were made in 2005, most developers do not account for earthquakes in building design. A geotechnician for the Myanmar Earthquake Committee described a future major earthquake as "chaos". The impact in Yangon could be similar to that of Kathmandu during the 2015 Nepal earthquake, where 9,000 were killed.

See also

List of earthquakes in 1930
List of earthquakes in Myanmar

References

Sources

1930 earthquakes
Earthquakes in Myanmar
Strike-slip earthquakes
1930 disasters in Asia
1930 in Southeast Asia
1930 tsunamis
Tsunamis in Myanmar
Bago Region
History of Yangon